Contract is a 2008 Indian Hindi-language action drama film written by Prashant Pandey and directed by Ram Gopal Varma. The film is set up in the backdrop of terrorism, and the infiltration by R.A.W. and Intelligence Bureau.

Starring Adhvik Mahajan, Upendra Limaye, Prasad Purandare, and Zakir Hussain in pivotal roles, the film received mixed reviews. The film was screened retrospective at the 2010 Fribourg International Film Festival.

Plot 
The story revolves around an ex-Special Protection Group Commando, Amaan Malik, whose wife and daughter, are killed in a terrorist attack. Indian Agents, working with the RAW of India, approach Amaan for collaboration, to hunt the mastermind behind the serial terrorist attacks in Mumbai, Sultan. Sultan, is executing another mission of serial blasts, including a government hospital in Mumbai. Supported by the Intelligence Bureau (India), how RAW and Amaan are able to infiltrate the underworld gangs, to reach Sultan, forms the rest of the plot.

Cast 
 Adhvik Mahajan as Amaan Malik
 Sakshi Gulati as Iya
 Kishor Kadam as Dara Bajaj
 Sumeet Nijhawan as R.D.
 Amruta Khanvilkar as Divya Jalani
 Upendra Limaye as Goonga
 Amruta Subhash as Goonga's Wife
 Vibha Cheebur as Commissioner
 Prasad Purandare as Ahmad Hussain
 Jaspaul Sandhu as Home Minister
 Raaj Gopal as RAW Shridhar
 Vikas Shrivastav as RAW Lalji
 Zakir Hussain as Sultan Jabbar Khan
 Brajesh Jha as Zahwari
 Yasir Khan as Allwyn
 Jai Tari as Bhansal

Soundtrack 
 "Maula Khair Kare" – Shilpa Rao, Sukhwinder Singh
 "The Heart Of Contract" – Instrumental
 "Jeene Ka" – Runa Rizvi, Ravi Shankar
 "Badalon Pe" – Shaan
 "Saathiya" – Adnan Sami, Tulsi Kumar
 "Har Kafan" – Abhishek Nailwal, Runa Rizvi
 "Twinkle Twinkle" – Amitrajit Bhattacharee, Devika Verma, Rajana Verma, Trishe
 "Khallas" – Asha Bhosle, Sudesh Bhosle, Sapna Awasthi
 "Hai Aag Yeh" – Sunidhi Chauhan
 "Take Lite" – Jiah Khan

References

External links 

Films directed by Ram Gopal Varma
Films set in Mumbai
Films about terrorism in India
2008 action drama films
2000s spy thriller films
2008 crime thriller films
Indian action drama films
Indian avant-garde and experimental films
Indian crime thriller films
Indian spy thriller films
Insurgency in Khyber Pakhtunkhwa fiction
Films shot in Mumbai
2008 films
2000s Hindi-language films
Films shot in India
Films about the Research and Analysis Wing
2000s avant-garde and experimental films
India–Pakistan relations in popular culture